Charles Crawford Gorst (1885 - 1956) was an American performer, educator and a noted bird-call imitator. He called himself "The Bird Man" and travelled across the United States, giving talks to bird clubs, church gatherings, the Chautauqua assemblies, and at educational institutions from around 1915 to around 1924. His talks included his own paintings of birds made on large charts, entertaining anecdotes and whistled bird imitations. He claimed to be able to imitate more than 250 birds and he also made musical compositions that included his bird imitations.

Little is known of Gorst's early life but he was born in Omaha, Nebraska to Reverend William Gorst (of the Methodist church) and Agnes Campbell Crawford. He received a Bachelor of Arts in 1908 studying English and Philosophy at the Nebraska Wesleyan University and received a Bachelor of Sacred Theology from Boston in 1911. He also served as a laboratory assistant in ornithology at the Nebraska Wesleyan University. He married Grace Dishong in 1908. He was awarded the 1936 John Burroughs Medal for his "unusual art of interpreting bird songs". Around the same time the technology for recording bird song in the field improved making whistled imitations, often of doubtful accuracy, less popular. His own promotional brochure claimed that he frequently spoke at the American Museum of Natural History. He claimed that his use of large paintings held before flood lighting was more effective than lantern slides. He made numerous claims that he could strike up a chorus of birds in silent woods by his imitations, that he had imitated a young bird which led the mother to bring him a worm and that migrating birds called out to him. In 1917 the American Ornithologists' Union elected Gorst as an associate. In 1922 he promoted the protection of bobwhite quail in Mississippi claiming that it helped control boll weevils.

His claims were poetically rendered on stage to large audiences who bought tickets at 75 cents a person:

References

External links
 Promotional brochures of Gorst -  
 UCSB Catalog
 The Robin's return
 Spring Song
 Laughing Love (1915) - Edison wax recording
 Bird imitations
 Songs and calls of our native birds - 3
 Songs and calls of our native birds - 4

1885 births
1956 deaths
Whistlers
American impressionists (entertainers)
American ornithologists
20th-century American comedians
20th-century American zoologists